Edward ("Ed") Ofili (born 20 September 1957) is a Nigerian former sprinter who competed in the 1970s and specialized in 100 metres and 200 metres events. He was an Olympian, competing for Nigeria in 1976, and ran collegiate track and field for the University of Missouri He won a gold medal in 200 metres at the inaugural 1979 African Championships in Athletics.

Achievements

References

External links
Edward Ofili profile at All-Athletics.com

1957 births
Living people
Nigerian male sprinters